Antonio Telari (born 31 October 1971) is a retired Italian footballer. He played as a defender. He played one match in Serie A for Napoli on 26 May 1991 against Bologna. He then continued his career in lower series.

Career
1990-1991  Napoli 1 (0)
1991-1993  Fano 50 (1)
1993-1994 Donada 8 (0)
1994-1995  Castrovillari 16 (0)
1995-1997  Sambenedettese 61 (1)
1997-1998  Sangiovannese 27 (0)
1998-1999 Viterbese 10 (0)
1999-2000  Monterotondo ? (?)
2000-2001 Villalba ? (?)

External links
 
 

1971 births
Living people
Italian footballers
Serie A players
S.S.C. Napoli players
Alma Juventus Fano 1906 players
A.S. Sambenedettese players
A.S.D. Sangiovannese 1927 players
Pol. Monterotondo Lupa players

Association football midfielders
U.S. Castrovillari Calcio players